Joy Ellis is an English crime writer. She is the author of the DI Nikki Galena series, the DI Jackman and DS Marie Evans series, and the Detective Matt Ballard series of crime thrillers. In 2018 she was named Audible's Breakthrough Crime Writer of the Year.

Biography
Ellis was born in Kent, England, but spent most of her adult life in London and Surrey. She worked as an apprentice florist, ran a florist shop in Weybridge, and was a bookshop manager. She took part in a writers' workshop in Greece, and was encouraged by Sue Townsend, her tutor, to write seriously.

Ellis is married to her partner, Jacqueline, who is a retired police officer, and they live in the Lincolnshire Fens with several Springer spaniels.

Awards
 2019 Audie Awards finalist, Thriller/Suspense category: Their Lost Daughters, narrated by Richard Armitage, and published by Audible Studios

Novels

DI Nikki Galena series

DI Rowan Jackman & DS Marie Evans series

Detective Matt Ballard series

Other books

References

External links

Order of Books

Living people
English crime fiction writers
Year of birth missing (living people)
English women novelists
English thriller writers
Women thriller writers
21st-century English women writers
21st-century English novelists